Enrici is an Italian surname. Notable people with the surname include:

 Domenico Enrici (1909–1997), Italian bishop and Vatican diplomat
 Giuseppe Enrici (1898–1968), Italian road racing cyclist

See also
 Enrico

Italian-language surnames
Patronymic surnames
Surnames from given names